= Andreas Stefik =

American computer scientist

Andreas Stefik is a professor of computer science at the University of Nevada, Las Vegas and the creator of Quorum, a computer programming language created with features that improve access for people with visually impairments. Stefik conducts research in the areas of software engineering, accessibility, and computer science education. He is an advocate for increasing access to computer science in K–12 education.

== Education ==
Stefik began his education pursuing a bachelor's degree in music at Central Washington University, but graduated with a Bachelor's in Mathematics as well as Music. Stefik went on to receive his Master's Degree and PhD in Computer Science from Washington State University

== Career and research ==
As a computer science graduate student, Stefik became interested in the resources available for those who are blind or have low vision that wanted to pursue a degree in computer science. He found there was no language currently available accessible to the blind and visually impaired, and decided to create his own. The work began as a project called Sodbeans, and over the course of ten years he developed the language Quorum with his wife, which is also auditory and therefore more accessible to people with visual impairments. In 2016, Stefik received the White House Champion of Change award for Computer Science Education for his efforts.

Stefik has also created a model for computer science education for blind or visually impaired students that as of 2016 has been deployed in almost 20 schools.

Through Stefik's research and works, he has received many grants. Most notably, he received grants from the National Science Foundation to help build Quorum.

== Notable work ==
- An Empirical Investigation into Programming Language Syntax
- How do API documentation and static typing affect API usability?
- An empirical study on the impact of static typing on software maintainability

== Awards ==
- Java Innovation Award, Oracle Corporation, 2011
- White House Champion of Change for Computer Science Education, 2016
- Code.org Champions of Computer Science, 2018
